Paradysderina is a genus of spiders in the family Oonopidae. It was first described in 2011 by Platnick & Dupérré. , it contains 54 species from South America.

Species

Paradysderina comprises the following species:
Paradysderina apurimac Platnick & Dupérré, 2011
Paradysderina asymmetrica Platnick & Dupérré, 2011
Paradysderina baehrae Platnick & Dupérré, 2011
Paradysderina bagua Platnick & Dupérré, 2011
Paradysderina boyaca Platnick & Dupérré, 2011
Paradysderina carpish Platnick & Dupérré, 2011
Paradysderina carrizal Platnick & Dupérré, 2011
Paradysderina centro Platnick & Dupérré, 2011
Paradysderina chinacota Platnick & Dupérré, 2011
Paradysderina chingaza Platnick & Dupérré, 2011
Paradysderina consuelo Platnick & Dupérré, 2011
Paradysderina convencion Platnick & Dupérré, 2011
Paradysderina dracula Platnick & Dupérré, 2011
Paradysderina excavata Platnick & Dupérré, 2011
Paradysderina fatima Platnick & Dupérré, 2011
Paradysderina fusiscuta Platnick & Dupérré, 2011
Paradysderina globosa (Keyserling, 1877)
Paradysderina hermani Platnick & Dupérré, 2011
Paradysderina huila Platnick & Dupérré, 2011
Paradysderina imir Platnick & Dupérré, 2011
Paradysderina lefty Platnick & Dupérré, 2011
Paradysderina leticia Platnick & Dupérré, 2011
Paradysderina loreto Platnick & Dupérré, 2011
Paradysderina lostayos Platnick & Dupérré, 2011
Paradysderina macho Platnick & Dupérré, 2011
Paradysderina maldonado Platnick & Dupérré, 2011
Paradysderina malkini Platnick & Dupérré, 2011
Paradysderina monstrosa Platnick & Dupérré, 2011
Paradysderina montana (Keyserling, 1883)
Paradysderina newtoni Platnick & Dupérré, 2011
Paradysderina pecki Platnick & Dupérré, 2011
Paradysderina pinzoni Platnick & Dupérré, 2011
Paradysderina pira Platnick & Dupérré, 2011
Paradysderina pithecia Platnick & Dupérré, 2011
Paradysderina piura Platnick & Dupérré, 2011
Paradysderina puyo Platnick & Dupérré, 2011
Paradysderina righty Platnick & Dupérré, 2011
Paradysderina rothae Platnick & Dupérré, 2011
Paradysderina sauce Platnick & Dupérré, 2011
Paradysderina schizo Platnick & Dupérré, 2011
Paradysderina silvae Platnick & Dupérré, 2011
Paradysderina sucumbios Platnick & Dupérré, 2011
Paradysderina tabaconas Platnick & Dupérré, 2011
Paradysderina tambo Platnick & Dupérré, 2011
Paradysderina tambopata Platnick & Dupérré, 2011
Paradysderina thayerae Platnick & Dupérré, 2011
Paradysderina vaupes Platnick & Dupérré, 2011
Paradysderina vlad Platnick & Dupérré, 2011
Paradysderina watrousi Platnick & Dupérré, 2011
Paradysderina wygodzinskyi Platnick & Dupérré, 2011
Paradysderina yanayacu Platnick & Dupérré, 2011
Paradysderina yasua Platnick & Dupérré, 2011
Paradysderina yasuni Platnick & Dupérré, 2011
Paradysderina zamora Platnick & Dupérré, 2011

References

Oonopidae
Araneomorphae genera
Spiders of South America